Coat of Arms is the fifth studio album by Swedish heavy metal band Sabaton.

Track listing
All music by Joakim Brodén and all lyrics by Brodén and Pär Sundström (except lyrics on "Saboteurs" and "Midway" by Sundström only and lyrics on "Metal Ripper" and "Wehrmacht" by Brodén only).

Digipak edition bonus tracks
 "Coat of Arms (Instrumental)" (3:35)
 "Metal Ripper (instrumental)" (3:51)
Streaming and digital download bonus track
 "White Death (Instrumental)" (4:10)

Personnel
 Joakim Brodén – vocals
 Rickard Sundén – guitars
 Oskar Montelius – guitars
 Pär Sundström – bass
 Daniel Mullback – drums
 Daniel Mÿhr – keyboards

Chart performance

Certifications

Notes
 Because the official translation of "40:1" song from the former album was criticised by Polish fans, a contest was set for the best translation of the "Uprising" lyrics to Polish. The winning translation was chosen as the official.
 The riff in "White Death" has been borrowed from Ankie Bagger's "Where Were You Last Night".
 The video for "Uprising" was a re-enactment of Polish resistance during World War II and contained the actor Peter Stormare as well as Polish actors Monika Buchowiec and Mateusz Damięcki.

References

2010 albums
Sabaton (band) albums
Albums produced by Peter Tägtgren